Akramana (Kannada: ಆಕ್ರಮಣ) is a 1980 Indian Kannada film, directed by Girish Kasaravalli and produced by Sharath Kumar and S. Rao. The film stars Vijayakashi, Vaishali Kasaravalli, Padmashree and Chandrakumar Jain in the lead roles. The film has musical score by B. V. Karanth.

Cast

 Vijayakashi
 Vaishali Kasaravalli
 Padmashree
 Chandrakumar Jain
 Sai Venkatesh
 Girish Kumar Yadav
 Prakash Reddy
 Srinath
 G. G. Hegde
 Bhaskar
 Venkata Rao
 Shivaramaiah
 Devaiah
 Dr Chitagopi
 S. N. Rotti
 K. S. Anantharam
 B. S. Jayaram
 Swarnamma
 Pushpa
 Dechamma
 Swarnamma
 Mala
 Master Sanjeev

References

External links
 

1980s Kannada-language films